Retro Force is a Shoot-'em up game that is published and developed by Psygnosis. It is set to be based in the future where 4 brave pilots must travel back in time in order to bring back the lost pieces of the holy artifact, Retro Force was released in March 1999 which is only released in Europe, The soundtrack to the game was composed By Gary Mckill.

Gameplay
In Retro Force, you get to play as one of the four members of Retro Force, you can get to choose either Paris, Hawtin, Pi, or Sinclair whatever suits your skill, but they each have their own aerial attributes, with your chosen character, you then have to shoot down your enemies from the sky and from the ground, you'll get to earn points by shooting down the enemies.
And also, you get to collect Bonus crystals, the more bonus crystals you collect, the bigger the score, and of course keep an eye on the super crystals, they hide in hard to reach places and in secret hiding places.

Plot
The story is taken place on 29 November 2999 where the invasion starts and the Millennium celebration began to a halt, a giant UFO came towards the temple called the Commune of Worship which is home to the Holy Artifact, as the sirens blare at Combat Air Defense Academy(CADA), Retro Force battle out the UFO to stop them from taking the Holy Artifact, but they were too late as the final piece of the Holy Artifact combined with the rest, powers were unleashed leaving Retro force and the UFO disappear back through time.

Reception

Retro Force received mixed to negative reviews. Official UK PlayStation Magazine gave the game an 5 out of 10, while Das Offizielle PlayStation Magazin gave it an 3,3 out of 10. The only review that was decent enough, was from the German PlayStation Magazine called PlayStation Zone (later PlayZone), which the mag scored a 77% and also included a playable demo of the game on its cover disc of the fourth issue, in where the game was reviewed.

In one particular review from a German games magazine called MAN!AC, the review, which scored the game 2 stars, described the "brave pilots" on the cover above as "clowns".

References

1999 video games
Alien invasions in video games
PlayStation (console)-only games
Europe-exclusive video games
Video games set in the future
PlayStation (console) games
Shoot 'em ups
Psygnosis games
Multiplayer and single-player video games
Video games developed in the United Kingdom